Nicha "Eve" Lertpitaksinchai (born 14 August 1991) is a former professional tennis player from Thailand.

She has career-high WTA rankings of No. 280 in singles, achieved on 24 October 2016, and 144 in doubles, reached on 21 April 2014.

Lertpitaksinchai had her biggest success at the $50k 2013 Lexington Challenger, where she and Peangtarn Plipuech claimed the doubles title.

In 2019, she joined The Face Thailand (season 5) as one of the contestants of Team Toni.

WTA 125 tournament finals

Doubles: 1 (runner-up)

ITF finals

Singles (2–5)

Doubles (15–10)

External links
 
 
 

1991 births
Living people
Nicha Lertpitaksinchai
Tennis players at the 2010 Asian Games
Tennis players at the 2014 Asian Games
Tennis players at the 2018 Asian Games
Nicha Lertpitaksinchai
Nicha Lertpitaksinchai
Nicha Lertpitaksinchai
Nicha Lertpitaksinchai
Southeast Asian Games medalists in tennis
Competitors at the 2011 Southeast Asian Games
Nicha Lertpitaksinchai
Nicha Lertpitaksinchai